Road to the Sun is a studio album by American jazz guitarist Pat Metheny, released in March 2021 on BMG's Modern Recordings label. The liner notes include credits for photos of a roseate tern and sooty tern, while the bird on the front cover most closely resembles a black-billed magpie.

Track listing 
All tracks are written by Pat Metheny, except the final, which is by Arvo Pärt.

Personnel 
 Jason Vieaux - guitar (tracks 1-4)
 Los Angeles Guitar Quartet - guitars (tracks 5-10)
 Pat Metheny  - guitar (tracks 6,9), 42-string guitar (track 11)
 Pete Karam - recording, mixing, mastering
 Doyle Partners - artwork and design

References

External links 

2021 albums
Pat Metheny albums
Sony BMG albums